Tulipa clusiana, the lady tulip, is an Asian species of tulip native to Afghanistan, Iran, Iraq, Pakistan and the western Himalayas. It is widely cultivated as an ornamental and is reportedly naturalized in France, Spain, Portugal, Italy, Tunisia, Greece, and Turkey.

The plant grows to a height of 6 to 12 in (15 to 30 cm). It flowers during the spring season.

The following cultivars have received the Royal Horticultural Society's Award of Garden Merit. All are relatively small, with narrow pointed tepals, often bi-coloured.
'Cynthia' (outsides pink edged pale yellow, insides pale yellow)
'Lady Jane' (inners white, outers pink bordered with white)
'Peppermintstick' (outers cerise pink with white borders, inners white)
'Tinka' (yellow inside, red bordered yellow on the outside)
var. chrysantha (yellow flowers, flushed red on the outside)

Gallery

References

External links

 John Grimshaw's Garden Diary: Tulipa clusiana

clusiana
Flora of Asia
Flora of Pakistan
Garden plants
Plants described in 1803